Share the Well is the sixth major release from Caedmon's Call. It was released on October 12, 2004 through Essential Records.

Inspired by the band's trip to India, Brazil and Ecuador, Share the Well explores universal Christian themes in a variety of geographies, with songs that look through the eyes of both visitor and resident. Major themes include God's all-sufficient goodness, the need for people to share what they have with each other, and the inherent dignity of the oppressed; in particular the Dalit caste of India.

This album was recorded in:
OLIO – Lucknow, Uttar Pradesh, India
Puerto Lago – Otavalo, San Pablo Lake, Ecuador
Dark Horse Recording – Franklin, Tennessee
The Moore's House – Houston, Texas
Second Studios – Houston, Texas
and also
domestic locations in Ecuador
domestic locations in Brazil
Sunrise Studios – Houston, Texas
The Velvet Eagle – Nashville, Tennessee
Masterphonics Tracking Room – Nashville, Tennessee

Track listing
 "Intro" – 0:26
 "Share the Well" – 3:09 (Randall Goodgame)
 "There's Only One (Holy One)" – 3:42 (Goodgame)
 "Jenny Farza" – 0:40
 "Mother India" – 4:48 (Andrew Osenga, Goodgame)
 "International Love Song" – 3:06 (Joshua Moore, Osenga, Goodgame)
 "All I Need (I Did Not Catch Her Name)" – 3:33 (Goodgame)
 "Los Hermanos Count Off" – 0:26
 "Volcanoland" – 3:47 (Moore)
 "The Roses" – 4:00 (Osenga, Jeff Miller)
 "Mirzapur Group" – 0:26
 "Bombay Rain" – 2:46 (Osenga)
 "The Innocent's Corner" – 5:01 (Moore)
 "Sarala" – 2:20 (Goodgame, Osenga, Cliff Young)
 "Punjabi Group with Joseph D'Souza" – 0:54
 "Wings of the Morning" – 4:46 (Osenga, Moore)
 "Dalit Hymn" – 11:41 (Moore, Goodgame)

 (The album's last track features two hidden tracks: A brief solo song by Andrew Osenga, possibly titled "I Miss You", and as a longer excerpt of the Mirzapur Group performance heard earlier in the album.)
 The album featured only one other song sung by Andrew Osenga, "Bombay Rain".

Personnel

Band members 
 Cliff Young – lead vocals, acoustic rhythm guitar, backing vocals
 Danielle Young – vocals, backing vocals
 Garett Buell – percussion, tablas, dholar, manjira, mixing bowl, water pail, congas, bongos, cajon, djembe, surdo, giant ganza-udu, agogô, drum battery, ankle bells, hand claps
 Jeff Miller – bass guitar
 Todd Bragg – drums, surdo, pandeiro, drum battery, tamborim
 Joshua Moore  – Hammond B-3, piano, acoustic guitar, electric guitar, nylon guitar, high strung guitar, bass guitar, string arrangement, synth, harmonium, accordion, copichand, ramantar, dholar, drum battery, kalimba, tamboor, backing vocals
 Andrew Osenga – acoustic guitar, electric guitar, dobro, charango, keyboard bass, vocals, backing vocals, drum battery

Guest musicians
 Ze DeFaria – surdo, ankle bells, hand claps, repinique, pandeiro
 Jayant Jaypur Walle – tablas
 Jenny Farza – Backing vocals
 Samuel Tugulinago – charango, guitar, panflute
 Efrain Tugulinago – flutes, panfulte
 Hamberto Aigaje – guitar, flutes, panflute
 David Tuglinago – guitar
 Samson Manwatkar – vocals
 Solomon Raju – harmonium
 Joshua – harmonium
 The Mirzapur Group (Dalit Music Team) – vocals
 Pastor Yuhanna – vocals

References

Caedmon's Call albums
2004 albums
Essential Records (Christian) albums